Newton County is the easternmost county in the U.S. state of Texas. As of the 2020 census, its population was 12,217. Its county seat is Newton. The county is named for John Newton, a veteran of the American Revolutionary War.

Newton County is included in the Beaumont-Port Arthur Metropolitan Statistical Area.

As of 2000, it had the second-lowest population density for all counties in East Texas, behind only Red River County, and the lowest population density in Deep East Texas.

Geography

Major highways
  U.S. Highway 190
  State Highway 12
  State Highway 62
  State Highway 63
  State Highway 87
  Recreational Road 255

Adjacent counties and parishes
 Sabine County (north)
 Vernon Parish, Louisiana (northeast)
 Beauregard Parish, Louisiana (east)
 Calcasieu Parish, Louisiana (southeast)
 Orange County (south)
 Jasper County (west)

Demographics

Note: the US Census treats Hispanic/Latino as an ethnic category. This table excludes Latinos from the racial categories and assigns them to a separate category. Hispanics/Latinos can be of any race.

As of the census of 2000,  15,072 people, 5,583 households, and 4,092 families resided in the county.  The population density was 16 people per square mile (6/km2).  The 7,331 housing units averaged 8 per square mile (3/km2).  The racial makeup of the county was 75.84% White, 20.69% Black, 0.63% Native American, 0.27% Asian, 0.03% Pacific Islander, 1.56% from other races, and 0.98% from two or more races.  About 3.79% of the population was Hispanic or Latino of any race.

Of the 5,583 households, 32.30% had children under the age of 18 living with them, 58.10% were married couples living together, 11.50% had a female householder with no husband present, and 26.70% were not families; 24.10% of all households were made up of individuals, and 10.50% had someone living alone who was 65 years of age or older.  The average household size was 2.59 and the average family size was 3.07.

In the county, the population was distributed as  26.20% under the age of 18, 9.00% from 18 to 24, 26.60% from 25 to 44, 24.10% from 45 to 64, and 14.20% who were 65 years of age or older.  The median age was 37 years. For every 100 females, there were 104.10 males.  For every 100 females age 18 and over, there were 102.80 males.

Males had a median income of $31,294 versus $17,738 for females. The per capita income for the county was $13,381. About 15.50% of families and 19.10% of the population were below the poverty line, including 24.40% of those under age 18 and 17.30% of those age 65 or over.

Politics

United States Congress

Political culture
Newton County was once one of the most Democratic-leaning counties in East Texas and the Deep South altogether. The county voted for the Democratic candidate in every election since Texas first participated in 1848 (excluding the 1860, 1864, and 1868 elections when Texas had seceded). Even when Republicans Herbert Hoover and Dwight D. Eisenhower carried Texas in 1928, 1952, and 1956, respectively, Newton County remained firmly Democrat.

The Democratic streak in Newton County was ended in 1968 when American Independent Party candidate George Wallace narrowly won the county with 42.6% of the vote against Democrat Hubert Humphrey's 41.7%. President Richard Nixon in 1972 became the first Republican to ever win the county in an election with 54% of the vote against Democrat George McGovern's 45.4%. After 1972, the county returned to voting Democrat, surviving the landslide elections of Republicans Ronald Reagan and George H. W. Bush in 1980, 1984, and 1988, respectively. In fact, Newton County was Walter Mondale's strongest county in East Texas in the 1984 election, winning 60.6% of the vote, and one of only four in the region to vote for him. Michael Dukakis in 1988 remains the last Democratic presidential candidate to win over 60% of the vote in the county.

Since 1992, the Democratic percentage in Newton County has decreased in every election, culminating in Al Gore's narrow win in 2000 with 50.16% against Governor George W. Bush's 48.56%. As of 2020, Gore remains the last Democrat to win the county's votes in a presidential election. Since 2004, the Republican candidate has comfortably carried the county in every election, with Bush winning 55.42% in 2004, John McCain winning 65.51% in 2008, Mitt Romney winning 70.06% in 2012 and Donald Trump winning 77.48% and 80.11% in 2016 and 2020 respectively.

Communities

City
 Newton (county seat)

Unincorporated areas

Census-designated places 
 Deweyville
 South Toledo Bend

Unincorporated communities 

 Adsul
 Biloxi
 Bon Wier
 Burkeville
 Call
 Trotti
 Wiergate

Ghost towns
 Belgrade
 Princeton
 Shankleville

Education
School districts:
 Brookeland Independent School District
 Burkeville Independent School District
 Deweyville Independent School District
 Kirbyville Consolidated Independent School District
 Newton Independent School District

Areas of Newton County in Brookeland ISD, Burkeville ISD, and Newton ISD are assigned to Angelina College. Legislation does not specify a community college for the remainder of the county.

See also

 National Register of Historic Places listings in Newton County, Texas
 Recorded Texas Historic Landmarks in Newton County

References

External links

 Newton County government's website
 Newton County Public Health District  The Public Health District Website for Newton County.
 

 
1846 establishments in Texas
Populated places established in 1846